Eugénie Anne Claudine Le Sommer (born 18 May 1989) is a French professional footballer who plays as a forward for French club Lyon and the France national team. She primarily plays as a creative attacking midfielder and left winger, but has also played as a second striker for her country.

Le Sommer is one of the most decorated players in modern women's club football and has scored more goals for France than any player of any gender. She has won ten French domestic titles and is one of just three players to have won a record eight European Cups with Lyon.

Early life 
Le Sommer is one of seven children, five girls and two boys.  Her father, Thierry, was a policeman before he retired.  Her mother had played football in her youth.

Club career
Le Sommer began playing football at the age of five joining the women's section of Trélissac FC. After a four-year stint at the club, she joined AS Guermeur in the Brittany region. She later played at one of the biggest clubs in the region, FC Lorient, and earned many honors in the youth section of the club helping her youth sides win the Coupe Fédérale 16 ans in 2005 and the Mozaïc Foot Challenge in 2006, with the latter being held at the prestigious Clairefontaine academy.

Le Sommer was later selected to attend CNFE Clairefontaine, the women's section of the Clairefontaine academy. After a short stint there, she joined D1 Féminine club Stade Briochin. In her debut season with Saint-Brieuc, Le Sommer appeared in all 22 league matches scoring four goals. The 2008–09 season saw her score 10 goals in 22 matches. For her efforts, she was nominated for the UNFP Female Player of the Year losing out to Olympique Lyonnais player Louisa Necib.

Le Sommer got off to a fast start for the 2009–10 season scoring ten goals in her first seven league matches, which included a hat trick against Toulouse in a 5–4 defeat. She finished the season as the league's top scorer and was awarded the UNFP Female Player of the Year the following season.

On 30 June 2010, Le Sommer announced she would be joining the four-time defending champions Olympique Lyonnais departing her former club, Stade Briochin, after three seasons.

On 30 August 2020, Le Sommer scored the opening goal in Lyon's 3–1 defeat of Wolfsburg in the final of the 2019–20 UEFA Women's Champions League. It was both Le Sommer and Lyon's seventh overall win in the competition and fifth in a row.

On 12 May 2021, it was announced that Le Sommer would be joining OL Reign in USA on loan for the 2021 season.

International career
Le Sommer has earned caps with the women's under-17, under-19, and under-20 teams. With the under-19 team, she participated in both the 2007 and 2008 editions of the La Manga Cup, as well as both the 2007 UEFA Women's Under-19 Championship, as an underage player, and 2008 UEFA Women's Under-19 Championship, with the latter being held on home soil. France reached the semi-finals at the 2007 finals and lost in the group stage in 2008. Le Sommer later featured with the under-20 team at the 2008 FIFA U-20 Women's World Cup, held in Chile. In the tournament, Le Sommer scored a team-leading four goals, which included a brace against Argentina in the final group stage match, which sent France through to the knockout rounds to face Nigeria. In the match against Nigeria, with France trailing 2–1, Le Sommer equalised in the 49th minute. France won 3–2 with a late goal from Nora Coton-Pélagie, but were eliminated in the next round by North Korea. Le Sommer was awarded the Bronze Ball as the tournament's third best player.

On 12 February 2009, Le Sommer made her international debut in a 2–0 win over the Republic of Ireland coming on as a substitute. After appearing consistently with the national team, which included scoring two goals over the course of four matches at a tournament in Cyprus, Le Sommer was selected by coach Bruno Bini to play at UEFA Women's Euro 2009, despite the player not appearing with the team during the qualification process. During the tournament, Le Sommer played in all four matches her nation contested. France reached as far as the quarterfinals losing to the Netherlands 4–5 on penalties with Le Sommer converting her penalty shot. On 23 September 2009, Le Sommer scored her third international goal against Serbia in a 2011 FIFA Women's World Cup qualification match.

She played for France at the 2012 Summer Olympics, scoring one goal, in the 2–1 loss to Japan in the semifinals.

Le Sommer was a striker for France at the 2015 FIFA Women's World Cup. She scored against England on 9 June 2015 in France's opening 1–0 victory.  She also scored two of France's goals in their 3–0 victory over South Korea in the quarterfinal.

She played in France's 2016 Olympic campaign, scoring two goals in the group stage, one against Colombia and one against New Zealand.

On 22 September 2020, Le Sommer scored two goals in a 7–0 win over North Macedonia in the Euro 2021 qualifiers, to become the all-time top scorer with 82 goals, breaking the previous record of 81 goals by Marinette Pichon.

Personal life 
Le Sommer married Florian Dariel, an Olympique Lyon employee, in Brittany on 11 August 2020, two days after winning the 2019–20 Coupe de France final. Current and former teammates like Ada Hegerberg and Corine Franco attended the ceremony.

Career statistics

Club

International

Honours
Lyon
Division 1 Féminine: 2010–11, 2011–12, 2012–13, 2013–14, 2014–15, 2015–16, 2016–17, 2017–18, 2018–19, 2019–20
Coupe de France Féminine: 2011–12, 2012–13, 2013–14, 2014–15, 2015–16, 2016–17, 2018–19, 2019–20
UEFA Women's Champions League: 2010–11, 2011–12, 2015–16, 2016–17, 2017–18, 2018–19, 2019–20, 2021–22
International Women's Club Championship: 2012
Valais Women's Cup: 2014

France
Cyprus Cup: 2012, 2014
SheBelieves Cup: 2017

Individual
 FIFA U-20 Women's World Cup Bronze Ball: 2008
 UNFP Female Player of the Year: 2009–10, 2014–15
 FIFA Women's World Cup All-Star Team: 2015
 UEFA Women's Player of the Year Award Top 10: 2014–15, 2015–16, 2016–17, 2017–18
 Algarve Cup Best Player: 2015
 France National Championship Best Striker: 2009–10, 2011–12, 2016–17
 UEFA Women's Champions League Best Striker: 2011–12
 UEFA Women's Championship All-Star Team: 2013
 FIFPro: FIFA FIFPro World XI 2015, 2016
 NWSL Best XI: 2021

See also
 List of women's footballers with 100 or more caps

References

External links

 
 
 
 Lyon profile
 
 
 

1989 births
Living people
French women's footballers
France women's youth international footballers
France women's international footballers
People from Grasse
CNFE Clairefontaine players
Olympique Lyonnais Féminin players
2011 FIFA Women's World Cup players
2015 FIFA Women's World Cup players
Footballers at the 2012 Summer Olympics
Footballers at the 2016 Summer Olympics
Olympic footballers of France
Women's association football midfielders
FIFA Century Club
French people of Breton descent
Division 1 Féminine players
Footballers from Brittany
2019 FIFA Women's World Cup players
National Women's Soccer League players
Sportspeople from Alpes-Maritimes
Sportspeople from Morbihan
Footballers from Provence-Alpes-Côte d'Azur
UEFA Women's Euro 2017 players
French expatriate women's footballers
Expatriate women's soccer players in the United States
French expatriate sportspeople in the United States
OL Reign players